Torres de Segre is a village in the province of Lleida and autonomous community of Catalonia, Spain. It is located by the Segre River.

Notable people
 Montserrat Soliva Torrentó (1943-2019), Catalan professor

References

External links
 Government data pages 

Municipalities in Segrià